Mitrella psilla is a species of sea snail in the family Columbellidae, the dove snails.

Description
The length of the shell attains 4.8 mm.

Distribution
This marine species occurs off West Africa, from Mauritania to Senegal and again in the provinces of Benguela and Namibe, Angola (Rolán, 2005). Introduced in Gulf of Tunis, Mediterranean Sea.

References

 Rolán E. 2005. Columbellidae (Gastropoda, Neogastropoda) of the gulf of Guinea with the description of eight new species. Iberus 23(2): 119-156
 Nappo A., Strizzi M.N.T., Mancini E. & Marcelli M. (2019). First record of Mitrella psilla (Duclos, 1846) (Gastropoda: Columbellidae) in Italy. Bollettino Malacologico. 55(1): 62–64.

External links
 Chenu J.C. (1842-1854). Illustrations conchyliologiques, ou description et figures de toutes les coquilles connues, vivantes et fossiles.,. Paris. 85 parts in 4 volume
 Duclos P.L. (1846-1850). Colombella. In J.C. Chenu, Illustrations conchyliologiques ou description et figures de toutes les coquilles connues vivantes et fossiles, classées suivant le système de Lamarck modifié d'après les progrès de la science et comprenant les genres nouveaux et les espèces récemment découvertes. Volume 40
 Antit, M.; Gofas, S.; Azzouna, A. (2009). A gastropod from the tropical Atlantic becomes an established alien in the Mediterranean. Biological Invasions. 12(5): 991-994

psilla
Gastropods described in 1846